Richard Derek Blight (October 17, 1955 – April 3, 2005) was a professional hockey player.

A native of Portage la Prairie, Manitoba, Blight had a long and varied hockey career as a Right Wing for teams in the National Hockey League (NHL), Central Hockey League (CHL) and the American Hockey League (AHL). After playing junior hockey in the Manitoba Junior Hockey League and the Western Hockey League, Blight was selected by the Vancouver Canucks in the first round of the 1975 NHL Amateur Draft. Blight was also drafted by the Michigan Stags in the second round of the 1974 WHA Amateur Draft, but did not play in the WHA. The name Blight is of Cornish origin.

Playing career
Blight was the Canucks' top scorer over his first three years in the NHL, finishing fifth, first and second in team scoring in 1975, 1976 and 1977 with a total of 187 points.

Blight was the recipient of the WCHL Rookie of the Year Award in 1973, and was a member of the CHL Second All-Star Team in 1981.

Blight retired from playing hockey in 1983 and began a career as a stockbroker and marketing consultant, as well as managing his family farm in his native Manitoba. In 1995, Blight was inducted into the Manitoba Sports Hall of Fame.

On April 3, 2005, Blight disappeared. Two weeks later, on April 18, after a Canada-wide search, Blight was found dead in a field on a farm near Lake Manitoba in his pickup truck. He had committed suicide.

Awards and achievements
1973: WCHL Rookie of the Year
1981: CHL Second All-Star Team
“Honoured Member” of the Manitoba Hockey Hall of Fame

Career statistics

Regular season and playoffs

International

Personal
His niece, Halli Krzyzaniak, currently plays in the Canadian Women's Hockey League for the Calgary Inferno.

References

External links

Profile at hockeydraftcentral.com
Rick Blight's biography at the Manitoba Hockey Hall of Fame

1955 births
2005 suicides
Brandon Wheat Kings players
Canadian ice hockey right wingers
Canadian people of Cornish descent
Canadian stockbrokers
Cincinnati Tigers players
Ice hockey people from Manitoba
Los Angeles Kings players
Michigan Stags draft picks
Moncton Alpines (AHL) players
National Hockey League first-round draft picks
New Haven Nighthawks players
Sportspeople from Portage la Prairie
Portage Terriers players
Suicides in Manitoba
Vancouver Canucks draft picks
Vancouver Canucks players
Wichita Wind players
2005 deaths